January is a collaborative studio album by Page McConnell and Trey Anastasio, both members of Phish. It was released on March 10, 2023, through JEMP Records, the band's label. Produced by Bryce Goggin, it is McConnell and Anastasio's second collaborative release after 2020's December, an EP consisting of acoustic re-recordings of past Phish songs. The album is a digital-only release. "Dancing in Midair" was released as a single on March 7, 2023.

Background

Anastasio said of the recording process: "We just walked into the studio with literally an acoustic guitar and a couple of synthesizers. Songs are mysterious. They sound different. It was limiting, in a great way."

Track listing

Personnel

Credits adapted from liveforlivemusic.com.
Page McConnell – keyboards, vocals
Trey Anastasio – guitar, bass, drums, vocals

References

Trey Anastasio albums
Page McConnell albums
2023 albums